

Names
 The Estouteville family is a former family of Norman nobility.

Places
 Estouteville, former municipality of Seine-Maritime, now part of Estouteville-Écalles
 Estouteville (Esmont, Virginia), a historic house
 Estouteville-Écalles, municipality of Seine-Maritime